Konglu is a town in north-east Kachin State in Myanmar approximately 55 kilometres from the Yunnan provincial border of south-west China.

The English botanist and plant collector Reginald Farrer was buried in Konglu in 1920.

References

Populated places in Kachin State